Ashwood School is a coeducational specialist school, located on Montpellier Road, Ashwood, Victoria. It was established in 1976 and caters for students aged 5 to 18 years old with mild intellectual disabilities.

Awards
Principal of the school, Helen Hatherly, was awarded a Medal of the Order of Australia in the 2014 Queen's Birthday Honours (Australia).

References

External links 
 Ashwood School website

1976 establishments in Australia
Educational institutions established in 1976
Schools in Melbourne
Special schools in Australia
Buildings and structures in the City of Monash